John Clarke Moore (21 September 1872 – 18 May 1943) was a Conservative member of the House of Commons of Canada. He was born in Saint-Chrysostome, Quebec and became a physician.

Moore attended school at Huntingdon, Quebec then studied at McGill University.

He was first elected to Parliament at the Châteauguay—Huntingdon riding in the 1930 general election. After serving his only term, the 17th Canadian Parliament, Moore was defeated by Donald Elmer Black of the Liberal party.

References

External links
 

1872 births
1943 deaths
Physicians from Quebec
Conservative Party of Canada (1867–1942) MPs
Members of the House of Commons of Canada from Quebec
McGill University alumni